Banksia strictifolia is a species of bushy shrub that is endemic to Western Australia. It has serrated, linear leaves with sharply-pointed teeth on both sides, creamy yellow flowers in heads of between forty-five and eighty-five, and egg-shaped to more or less spherical follicles.

Description
Banksia strictifolia is a bushy shrub that typically grows to a height of  but does not form a lignotuber. There are between eight and eighteen sharply-pointed, triangular teeth on each side of the leaves.

Taxonomy and naming
This banksia was first formally described in 1996 by Alex George in the journal Nuytsia and given the name Dryandra stricta from specimens he collected near the Brand Highway near Regans Ford in 1986. In 2007, Austin Mast and Kevin Thiele transferred all the dryandras to the genus Banksia but since the name Banksia stricta had already been used for a species now known as Pimelea stricta, Mast and Thiele changed the name to Banksia strictifolia. The specific epithet (strictifolia) is from the Latin strictus meaning "straight" and -folius meaning "leaved".

Distribution and habitat
Banksia strictifolia grows in kwongan between Three Springs and Badgingarra.

Conservation status
This banksia is listed as "not threatened" by the Western Australian Government Department of Parks and Wildlife.

References

strictifolia
Plants described in 1996
Taxa named by Alex George